is a professional Japanese baseball player. He plays pitcher for the Yomiuri Giants.

Professional career

Yokohama DeNA BayStars
On October 25, 2012, Inoh was drafted by the Yokohama DeNA BayStars in the 2012 Nippon Professional Baseball draft.

Inoh debuted with the BayStars in 2013. In May 2014, Ino was named the Central League's most valuable pitcher of the month.

Yomiuri Giants
During the 2020 offseason, Inoh exercised his free agent option. And he decided to sign a two-year deal with the Yomiuri Giants worth up to 200 million yen.

References

External links

 NPB.jp

1986 births
Living people
Baseball people from Tokyo
Jobu University alumni
Japanese baseball players
Nippon Professional Baseball pitchers
Yokohama DeNA BayStars players
Yomiuri Giants players